Upādhi is a term in Hindu philosophy meaning "imposition" or "limitation". In Hindu logic, an upādhi is the condition which accompanies the major term and  must be supplied to limit the too general middle term. For instance, "the mountain has smoke because it has fire" rests on the false premise that all fire is accompanied by smoke. To restrict the too general middle term here, 'damp fuel' should be added as the condition of smoky fire.

It can also be viewed as a disguise or vehicle for true reality, both defining something and limiting it.  For example, the body of a man or animal is the upādhi of its true self. Another example is that the true self, Brahman (Sanskrit: ब्रह्म) is hidden in a living being, jiva (Sanskrit: जीव) by the upādhi of the mind, Antahkarana (Sanskrit: अंतःकरण) and the creator God,  Īshvara (Sanskrit: ईश्वर) by the upādhi of Māyā (Sanskrit: माया) an appearance which is not what it seems. Upādhi is the condition of body and mind obscuring the true self which Indian schools of thought seek to remove for the attainment of moksha, realisation of the true self.

References

Hindu philosophical concepts
Sanskrit words and phrases